Rockley may refer to:

People 
Baron Rockley, a title in the Peerage of the United Kingdom
Alicia Margaret Amherst Cecil Rockley (1865–1941), English botanist and horticulturalist
Ann Rockley, Canadian technical communicator
Joseph Rockley Merrick (1862–1897), English, father of the Elephant Man
Rockley Wilson (1879–1957), English cricketer

Places 
Rockley, Barbados, a resort on the southern coast of Barbados
Rockley Park, a suburb in England
Rockley, New South Wales, a small village in Australia
Rockley, Nottinghamshire, a hamlet in England
Rockley, Wiltshire, a hamlet in England
Rockley, Nova Scotia, a small community in Cumberland County, Nova Scotia, Canada

See also 

 Rockleigh, New Jersey, a borough in the United States